Amit Dani (born 30 June 1973) is an Indian first-class cricketer who played for Mumbai. He made his first-class debut for Mumbai in the 1995–96 Ranji Trophy on 13 December 1995.

References

External links
 

1973 births
Living people
Indian cricketers
Mumbai cricketers